The 2005 Copa Petrobras Santiago was a professional tennis tournament played on outdoor red clay courts. It was part of the 2005 ATP Challenger Series. It took place in Santiago, Chile between 24 and 30 October 2005.

ATP entrants

Seeds

 Rankings are as of October 17, 2005.

Other entrants
The following players received wildcards into the singles main draw:
  Jorge Aguilar
  Marcelo Melo
  Felipe Parada
  Bruno Rosa

The following players received entry from the qualifying draw:
  Juan-Martín Aranguren
  Fabio Fognini
  Máximo González
  Gabriel Moraru

The following players received entry as lucky losers:
  Adrian Cruciat
  Alexandre Simoni

Withdrawals
 Before the tournament
  Carlos Berlocq (right shoulder injury) → replaced by  Adrian Cruciat
  Marcos Daniel (back injury) → replaced by  Alexandre Simoni

Champions

Singles

 Júlio Silva def.  Rubén Ramírez Hidalgo, 6–2, 6–3

Doubles

 Daniel Köllerer /  Oliver Marach def.  Lucas Arnold Ker /  Giovanni Lapentti, 6–4, 6–3

External links
Copa Petrobras de Tênis official website
ITF Search 
2005 Draws

Clay court tennis tournaments
Copa Petrobras Santiago
Copa